Gaurav Chopra (born 4 April 1979)  is an Indian television actor. He is best known for starring on Uttaran and Sadda Haq as Raghuvendra Pratap Rathore and Prof
Abhay Singh Ranawat respectively. He has appeared as a contestant on Bigg Boss 10. He has also acted in American film Blood Diamond, and appeared on the Georgian edition of international dance reality show Dancing with the Stars. He was last seen in ALT Balaji's web series titled Fourplay and Viu's Love Lust & Confusion.

Early life
Chopra studied at St. Columba's School and graduated from National Institute of Fashion Technology in 2000.

Career
In 2003, Chopra appeared in the Tamil film Ottran, and in 2004 he had an appearance in the TV serial Saara Akaash and Karma on Star Plus. In 2006, acted in American film Blood Diamond, he was also a contestant in the reality TV dance show Nach Baliye 2, and in 2008 he participated in the first season of another dance show, Zara Nachke Dikha. In 2006, he also acted in the Hollywood movie Blood Diamond, and played Samay Khurana on Aisa Des Hai Mera. He played the grey character of Raghuvendra Pratap Rathore on the Colors TV soap opera Uttaran, and won the Colors Golden Petal Awards-Most Dumdar Personality in the year 2012 for this role. He was seen in the gangster film Rangdari, which was released in April 2013.

In April 2016, he participated in the Georgian edition of international dance reality show Dancing with the Stars, where he was chosen as a cultural ambassador.
After a sudden exit after 6 weeks, it was revealed that he left the show because of a prior commitment.

Later in 2016 he participated in the 10th season of Bigg Boss and was evicted on 1 January 2017.

In 2018, he played the role of a casanova in ALT Balaji's web series, Fourplay.

Personal life
Chopra married his longtime girlfriend, Hitisha Cheranda, on 19 February 2018 in a private ceremony. They became parents of a boy in 2020.

Filmography

Television

Films
 Ottran (2003) as Ghazi Baba
 Ghoom (2006) as Balbir
 Blood Diamond (2006) as Journalist
 Men Will Be Men (2011) as Jimmy
 Bachchan Pandey (2022) as Bheema

Web series
Fourplay (2018) as Bobby Bhushan Chawla
Love Lust and Confusion (2018) as Rahil Khan
Hello Mini as Aditya Grover 
Rana Naidu (2023) as Prince Reddy

Dubbing roles

Live action films

References

External links

 
 

1967 births
Punjabi Hindus
Living people
Indian male stage actors
Indian male television actors
21st-century Indian male actors
Male actors from New Delhi
Punjabi people
Bigg Boss (Hindi TV series) contestants